Ixora is the fifth full-length album by Florida-based indie rock band Copeland. Pre-orders were made available on April 1, 2014, and the album was originally scheduled to be released on October 30, 2014. Due to issues during recording that prolonged its completion, the album's release date was postponed until November 24, 2014.

Ixora was recorded and produced in Aaron Marsh's studio, The Vanguard Room, in Lakeland, Florida, and was mixed by Michael Brauer. In addition to the standard ten-track album, a twin, deluxe edition was also recorded and made available for purchase as part of a pre-order exclusive bundle. The twin edition is a double-disc set. Disc one is an extended version of Ixora that contains an additional bonus track, while disc two is an alternate version of the album. Like a remix album, it can be listened to on its own but it can also be played in sync with disc one. In theory, playing both discs at the same time will create a quadraphonic version of Ixora.

Track listing

Reception

Ixora has been well received by critics, with Metacritic awarding the album an aggregate score of 77/100 based on four reviews.  Keagan Ilvonen of AbsolutePunk wrote, "There hasn’t been a Copeland album as complete as Ixora". Mark Demming of AllMusic stated, "Copeland is embracing a more mature subject matter than they did on their early albums, but with the same moody and thoughtful musical approach that marked their best-known work".

Personnel
Copeland
 Aaron Marsh – vocals, guitar, bass, piano, keyboards, trombone, programming, string and wind arrangements
 Bryan Laurenson – guitar, keyboards
 Stephen Laurenson – guitar, keyboards, programming
 Jonathan Bucklew – drums, percussion

Guest musicians
Steff Koeppen – vocals on "Ordinary" (only Twin version), "Chiromancer", "Like I Want You" and "World Turn" (only Twin version)
Matthew Davis – cello
Joshua Dampier – violin, viola
Matt Evers – bassoon
Steve Jones – trumpet
Jesse Bryant – clarinet
Eva Stillinger – French horn
Dawn Hardy – oboe
Mikel Larrinaga – sax

Production
 Produced by Aaron Marsh
 Mixed by Michael Brauer, Quad Studio, New York
 Mastered by Joe LaPorta

Notes

Copeland (band) albums
2014 albums
Albums produced by Aaron Marsh